Raghava Kurup Narendra Prasad (26 December 1946  3 November 2003) was an Indian actor, playwright, director, teacher and literary critic. He was born at Mavelikkara in the erstwhile Kingdom of Travancore. Appreciated for his body language and performance by the audience and critics, he is known for portraying character roles and villain characters in Malayalam films.

He moved to  Institute of English, University of Kerala for his post-graduation in English Language and Literature. A voracious reader in Malayalam and English, Narendra Prasad distinguished himself as a potential man of letters even as a degree student. He used to take part in the Malayalam and English literary discussions, debates and competitions organised at the college and university levels, and won prizes. His play Souparnika won the Kerala Sahitya Akademi Award in 1985.

Narendra Prasad started his career as a college teacher; he joined Bishop Moore College in 1967 as lecturer in English. He got into government service in 1968, and worked  as lecturer at Government Victoria College, Palakkad, and Govt. Arts College, Trivandrum, and as Professor at University College, Thiruvananthapuram. In 1989 while working as Professor of English at University College, he was selected for the post of Director, School of Letters of Mahatma Gandhi University, Kottayam. He continued in this post until his demise.

Awards

Kerala State Film Awards:

Second Best Actor – 1993 – Paithrukam

Film 
He earned recognition as an actor with his portrayal of semi-villainous characters. His hit films include Meleparambil Aanveedu,Aniyan Bava Chetan Bava,Thalastaanam, Utsavamelam, Paithrukam, Sthalathe Pradhana Payyans, Ekalavyan, Yaadhavam, Aaram Thamburan, Krishnagudiyil Oru Pranayakalathu, Njangal Santhushtaranu, Ustaad, Vazhunnor, One Man Show,  and Susanna.  He acted in over 150 films, winning the State Award for the 'Best Supporting Actor' for "Paithrukam."

Death
He died at PVS Hospital, Kozhikode on 3 November 2003, due to cardio-respiratory arrest. He had been admitted in Amrita Hospital, Ernakulam for apnea, caused by interstitial lung disease (ILD), a condition that caused disintegration of lungs. From there he was moved to PVS Hospital, where though he gained consciousness, he succumbed to the illness. He was aged 56 at the time of his death. He was cremated with full state honours at his home in Mavelikkara.

Filmography

As an actor

Brahmasuran (2005)
Deepangal Sakshi (2005) as Mullakkal Bhaskaran Nair
The Campus (2005) as Narendran
Kerala House Udan Vilpanakku (2004) as Paramu Nair
Kottaram Vaidyan (2004) as Bhageerathan
Kusruthi (2004) as Sreevallabhavan
Gaurisankaram (2003)
Valathottu Thirinjal Nalamathe Veedu (2003) as Aditya Varma
Varum Varunnu Vannu (2003) as Varghese Vaidyan
Mizhi Randilum (2003) as Musafir Babu
Nakshathrakkannulla Rajakumaran Avanundoru Rajakumari (2002) as Adv Veerabhadra Kurup
Dany (2002) as Fr. Simon
Videsi Nair Swadesi Nair (2002) as Bhaskaran Nair
Krishnapakshakilikal (2002)
Kadha (2002)
Punyam (2002)
Onnaman (2002)
Abharanacharthu (2002)
Swapnahaliyil Oru Naal(2002)
One Man Show (2001) as K. R. Menon
Megasandesam (2001) as Samuel
Nakshathragal Parayathirunnathu (2001) as Vasudeva Panicker
Kakki Nakshthram (2001) as Thomas Vattoly
Randam Bhavam (2001) as Ananthakrishnan's father
Andolanam (2001)
Ee Nadu Innalevare (2001) as Vishambharan Ambalakkadan 
Saivar Thirumeni (2001) as Mazhamangalathu Narayanan Nampoothirippadu
Susanna (2000)
Sahayathrikakku Snehapoorvam (2000)
Narashimham (2000) as Mooppil Nair
Mazhanoolkkanavu (2000)
Gopalannayarude Thaadi (1999)
Njangal Santhushtaranu (1999) as Geethu's Father
Rishivamsam (1999)
Udayapuram Sulthan (1999) as Avittam Thirunal Narayana Varma
Pranayanilaavu (1999)
F.I.R (1999) as Rahim Haji
Ustaad (1999) as Nandan's Father
Vazhunnor (1999) as Kochousepp
Aakhosham (1998)
British Market (1998)
Sooryaputhran (1998)
Panchaloham (1998) as Kuppuvachan Mushari
Ilavankodu Desham (1998) as Adithyan
Kottaram Veettile Apputtan (1998)
Mayilpeelikkavu (1998) as Rahuleyan
Malabaril Ninnoru Manimaaran (1998)
Manthri Malikayil Manassammatham (1998)
Aaram Thamburan (1997) as Kolapulli Appan
Asuravamsam (1997) as Mayor Swami/Ranganathan Swamy
Kalyanappittannu (1997)
Innalekalillathe (1997)
Kaliyattam (1997)
Krishnagudiyil Oru Pranayakalathu (1997) as Meenakshi's Father
Suvarna Simhaasanam (1997) as Meledathu Madhavan Nair
Kannur (1997)
Bhoopathi (1997) as Mahendra Varma
Kilikurissiyile Kudumba Mela (1997)
Raajathanthram (1997)
Kalyanapittennu (1997)
Moonu Kodiyum Munnuru Pavanum (1997)
Kathapurushan (1996) as Vasu
Dilliwala Rajakumaran (1996) as Maharaja
Kunkumacheppu (1996)
Rajaputhran (1996) as Vamadevan Karunan
Excuse Me Ethu Collegila (1996)
Kanchanam (1996)
Sulthan Hyderali (1996)
Mayoora Nrithyam (1996)
Sooryaputhrikal (1996)
Devaraagam (1996)
Oru Abhibhashakante Case Diary (1995) as Jagadish T. Nambiar
Sindoora Rekha (1995) as Menon
Aksharam (1995) as Krishna Murthy
Ezharakoottam (1995)
Munpe Parakkunna Pakshi (1995)
Alancheri Thamprakkal (1995) as Chanthappan Gurukkal
Aniyan Bava Chetan Bava (1995) as Kuttan Bava (Chettan Bava)
Kalamasseriyil Kalyanayogam (1995) as Sankara Menon
Kalyaanji Aanandji (1995)
Kidilol Kidilam (1995) as Ramabhadran
Mangalam Veettil Manaseswari Gupta (1995) as Muthachan
Sargavasantham (1995) as Dr. Sarathchandra Varma
Boxer (1995) as Rajagopalan Thampi
Chantha (1995)
Chaithanyam (1995)
Mimics Action 500 (1995)
Thirumanassu (1995) as Thirumanassu
Tom & Jerry (1995) as Ananthan Nambiar/Chandrasekhara Varma
Vendor Daniel State Licensy (1994)
Bharanakoodam (1994)
Sukrutham (1994) as Doctor
Vishnu (1994) as Mathews
Daada (1994)
Bheesmacharya (1994) as Rajakumaran Thampy
CID Unnikrishnan B.A., BEd (1994) as CID Agency Head
Galileo (1994) as Galileo
Chukkan (1994) as Mahendra Varma
Pradhakshinam (1994)
Kochaniyan (1994)
Malappuram Haji Mahanaya Joji (1994)
Pavithram (1994) as Sankaran Pillai
Vardhakya Puranam (1994)
Aayirappara (1993) as Padmanabha Kaimal
Ammayane Sathyam (1993) as Jaganatha Varma
Bandhukkal Sathrukkal (1993)
Bhagyavan (1993) as Divakaran Thekkinthada
Ekalavyan (1993) as Swami Amoorthananda
Janam (1993) as Azheekkal Raghavan
Kavadiyattam (1993)
Meleparambil Aanveedu (1993) as Thrivikram muthallali
Paithrukam (1993)
Sarovaram (1993)
Journalist(1993) as Anantharama Sharma
Thalamura (1993)
Yadhavam (1993)
Kudumba Sneham (1993)
Padaleeputhram (1993)
Pravachakan (1993) as Kurian
Sthalathe Pradhana Payyans (1993) as Kunjikannan Nambyar
Aardram (1992) as Vamadevan
Kudumbasametham (1992)
Pandu Pandoru Rajakumari (1992) as Robert Franklin D'Souza
Rajasilpi (1992) as Staanu Aashaan
Thalastaanam (1992) as G. Parameswaran
Ulsava Melam (1992)
Ootty Pattanam (1992) as Rajashekhara Varma
Advaitham (1992) as Sreekanta Pothuwal
Unnikuttanu Joli Kitti (1990)
Asthikal Pookunnu (1989)

As a dubbing artist
Orkkapurathu - Voice for N. L. Balakrishnan
Adharvam - Voice for Charuhasan
Vaishali - Voice for Babu Antony
Douthyam - Voice for Babu Antony
Chithram - Voice for Poornam Viswanathan
Meenamasathile Sooryan - Voice for Kakka Ravi
Njan Gandharvan - voice of Lord Brahma

Television

Towards the second half of the nineties he ventured into television. Shayama Prasad's tele-film Peruvazhiyile Kariyilakal, was Prasad's first venture on the small screen
 Pandavapada (Doordarshan)
 Sthree (Asianet)
 Vedanakalude Viralppaadukal (Kairali TV)
 Shanghupushpam (Asianet)

Documentary film

The documentary film on late Prof. Narendraprasad's life, Arangozhinja Akshara Prabhu was produced by KULAKKARA CREATIONS and  directed by ARUN S,  Written by R HARIKRISHNAN, Cinematographed and edited by THANZIL RAJAN .Veteran Film directors Adoor Gopalakrishnan, Jayaraaj, Sooryakrishnamoorthi, Actors P.Sreekumar, M.R.Gopakumar, Actor and voice artiste Prof.Aliyar,  Politician M.A.Baby and many other appears in this documentary.The documentary was screened for the first time on 2011 at Mavelikkara Natyagraha  before a huge audience, where actor Jagathy Sreekumar received the first  disc copy of the project.

References

External links

Narendra Prasad at MSI
Narendra Prasad Foundation

1945 births
2003 deaths
Malayalam-language writers
People from Alappuzha district
Male actors from Alappuzha
Kerala State Film Award winners
Academic staff of the University College Thiruvananthapuram
University of Kerala alumni
Male actors in Malayalam cinema
Indian male film actors
Malayalam-language dramatists and playwrights
Recipients of the Kerala Sahitya Akademi Award
Academic staff of Government Victoria College, Palakkad
20th-century Indian dramatists and playwrights
Indian male dramatists and playwrights
20th-century Indian male actors
21st-century Indian male actors
Indian male voice actors
Indian male television actors
Male actors in Hindi television
Dramatists and playwrights from Kerala
Writers from Alappuzha
20th-century Indian male writers